Azerbaijan—New Zealand relations refer to the bilateral relations between Azerbaijan and New Zealand.

Diplomatic relations 
Diplomatic relations between Azerbaijan and New Zealand were established on 29 June 1992.

The diplomatic representation of Azerbaijan in New Zealand is located in Canberra (Australia). The diplomatic representation of New Zealand in Azerbaijan is located in Moscow (Russia).

On 23 December 2013, Azerbaijan's Extraordinary Ambassador to Australia, Rovshan Jamshidov, was simultaneously appointed as the country's Ambassador to New Zealand. 2

Inter-parliamentary relations 
On 17 December 2013, a working group on inter-parliamentary relations between Azerbaijan and New Zealand was established in the Milli Majlis (Parliament of Azerbaijan). The head of the group is Chingiz Ganizade.

In October 2016, at the initiative of the Azerbaijani Embassy to Australia and New Zealand, a friendship group on inter-parliamentary relations between Azerbaijan and New Zealand was established in the House of Representatives in the New Zealand Parliament. The group is chaired by Todd Miller.

The Milli Majlis of Azerbaijan also has a friendship group for inter-parliamentary relations, consisting of 17 members and led by Khanlar Fatiev.

High-level visits 
On 5–6 December 2013, the special envoy of the Prime Minister of New Zealand for Central Asia, former Prime Minister of New Zealand Jim Bolger, paid an official visit to Azerbaijan. During the visit, the emissary met with the Chairman of the Milli Majlis of Azerbaijan – Ogtay Asadov, with the Deputy head of the Administration under the President of Azerbaijan – Novruz Mammadov, as well as with the Deputy Minister of Foreign Affairs – Khalaf Khalafov.

Economic cooperation 
Trade turnover (in thousands of US dollars)

According to statistics from the United Nations Trade Office (COMTRADE), in 2010, the volume of pork imports to Azerbaijan amounted to 18.41 thousand US dollars.

Cultural ties 
The Azerbaijan-New Zealand Friendship Society operates in New Zealand. The main goal of the Society is to establish and develop cooperation between countries in the cultural sphere. the Chairman of the company is Galib Mahmudov.

In February 2007, at the initiative of the New Zealand-Azerbaijan friendship Society "Azeri", an event was held in the New Zealand shopping center "Botany Downs" on the occasion of the 15th anniversary of the Khojaly genocide.

See also  
 Foreign relations of Azerbaijan
 Foreign relations of New Zealand

References 

 

 
New Zealand
Azerbaijan